James Alfred Norton (November 18, 1942 - January 12, 2021) is a former American football defensive lineman in the National Football League for the San Francisco 49ers, Atlanta Falcons, Philadelphia Eagles, Washington Redskins, and New York Giants.  He played college football at the University of Washington and was drafted in the third round of the 1965 NFL Draft.

Sportspeople from Wilmington, North Carolina
American football defensive linemen
Washington Huskies football players
San Francisco 49ers players
Atlanta Falcons players
Philadelphia Eagles players
Washington Redskins players
New York Giants players
1942 births
2021 deaths